Jamie Murray and Bruno Soares were the defending champions, but lost in the first round to Sam Querrey and Donald Young. 

Henri Kontinen and John Peers won their maiden Grand Slam title, defeating Bob and Mike Bryan in the final, 7–5, 7–5.

Seeds

Draw

Finals

Top half

Section 1

Section 2

Bottom half

Section 3

Section 4

References

Draw

External links
 2017 Australian Open – Men's draws and results at the International Tennis Federation

Men's Doubles
Australian Open (tennis) by year – Men's doubles